Shultan District is a district in Kunar Province, Afghanistan.

The Kunar River separates Shaigal District from Shultan and both districts are connected by the Shultan bridge.

History
On 16 April 2022, Pakistani airstrikes and rocket attacks targeted the Chogam village of Shultan District, killing three girls, two boys, and one woman, and wounding one man.

References

Districts of Kunar Province